Ein Fall für B.A.R.Z. is a German children's television series, broadcast in 39 episodes between 2005 and 2007.

See also
List of German television series

External links
 

German children's television series
2005 German television series debuts
2007 German television series endings
German-language television shows